HeroQuest is a video game based on the HeroQuest board game.

A sequel, HeroQuest II: Legacy of Sorasil, was released in 1994 for the Amiga 1200 and Amiga CD32.

Gameplay

Reception 
The One gave the Amiga version of Hero Quest an overall score of 91%, expressing that it "for the most part" faithfully recreates the tabletop version, but is 'oversimplified' in some areas, and stating that "This over-simplifying is mainly apparent in [combat]: a larger feeling of involvement would have been generated by even the simplest of additions such as the rolling of a dice [sic]. As it stands, the fights are pretty bland and act more as a temporary obstacle than as a major part of the excitement." The One also criticises Hero Quest's 'minimal' animation, but expresses that aside from these grievances, Hero Quest has succeeded in "taking all the elements from the board game and convincingly turning them into a highly playable computer game", furthermore calling it "An excellent conversion of an already enjoyable table-top".

The reviewer from Amiga Computing stated that "Hero Quest represents great value for the money". The reviewer from Amiga Action considered the game "Worth buying whether you are a fan of the boardgame or not. Excellent!". The reviewer from Amiga Format stated: "Gremlin have managed to produce the computer doppleganger of the original board-game bestseller and 300,000 people can't be wrong: can they?" The reviewer from CU Amiga stated that "Gremlin must be congratulated for a job well done." The reviewer from Amiga Power stated that "Hero Quest is an enjoyable piece of software indeed, and one of the best multiplayer experiences available for the Amiga." The reviewer from ACAR called the game "technically superb".

References

External links 
 
 

1991 video games
Acorn Archimedes games
Amiga games
Amstrad CPC games
Atari ST games
Commodore 64 games
DOS games
Fantasy video games
Gremlin Interactive games
Video games based on board games
Video games developed in the United Kingdom
Video games scored by Barry Leitch
ZX Spectrum games